John Hunter (born November 14, 1955) is an American projectile researcher, who developed the 1994 "supergun" Super High Altitude Research Project (SHARP) at the Lawrence Livermore National Laboratory. The ultimate aim of his research is to shoot payloads into space, at less than one tenth of the cost of unmanned rockets. John Hunter was the director of Quicklaunch until 2012 and currently runs a startup called Green Launch that is developing a light gas gun concept

See also 

 Gerald Bull
 Non-rocket spacelaunch

References

External links 
New technology testing may achieve the goals of HARP "space" gun
Video Interview of John Hunter - Gas Station In Space  moonandback 2011
Audio Interview of John Hunter on The space show
Interview of John Hunter on medium.com

21st-century American engineers
1955 births
Living people